A die, in the context of integrated circuits, is a small block of semiconducting material on which a given functional circuit is fabricated. Typically, integrated circuits are produced in large batches on a single wafer of electronic-grade silicon (EGS) or other semiconductor (such as GaAs) through processes such as photolithography. The wafer is cut (diced) into many pieces, each containing one copy of the circuit. Each of these pieces is called a die.

There are three commonly used plural forms: dice, dies and die. To simplify handling and integration onto a printed circuit board, most dies are packaged in various forms.

Manufacturing process 

Most dies are composed of silicon and used for integrated circuits. The process begins with the production of monocrystalline silicon ingots. These ingots are then sliced into disks with a diameter of up to 300 mm.

These wafers are then polished to a mirror finish before going through photolithography. In many steps the transistors are manufactured and connected with metal interconnect layers. These prepared wafers then go through wafer testing to test their functionality. The wafers are then sliced and sorted to filter out the faulty dies. Functional dies are then packaged and the completed integrated circuit is ready to be shipped.

Uses 

A die can host many types of circuits. One common use case of an integrated circuit die is in the form of a Central Processing Unit (CPU). Through advances in modern technology, the size of the transistor within the die has shrunk exponentially, following Moore's Law. Other uses for dies can range from LED lighting to power semiconductor devices.

Images

See also
 Die preparation
 Integrated circuit design
 Wire bonding and ball bonding

References

External links 
  – animation

Integrated circuits